Sarah Jones (born 24 June 1982) is an Australian television presenter and sportscaster on Fox Sports. Jones is currently a host with Fox Footy’s AFL coverage and Fox Cricket‘s BBL coverage after being on Fox Sports News as a reporter and host.

Personal life and education 
Jones grew up in Echuca, Victoria, as one of five siblings to parents father Tony and mother Chris. In 1990, Chris was killed in a car crash; Sarah was the only child not in the car at the time, while her siblings survived and escaped.

Jones is a mother of two girls, Mila (b. 2015) and Halle (b. 2017), with husband Leigh Carlson, a producer at Fox Footy. Jones supports the Essendon Football Club, her grandfather Jack Jones having been a premiership player at the Bombers and a tour guide at the club's former headquarters at Windy Hill.

Career 
At the age of 17, Jones did work experience at Seven Network working a project job during the 2000 Sydney Olympics; she did her studies at RMIT in journalism before joining the then Fox Footy Channel in 2002 as a reporter. She became a presenter and reporter at Fox Sports News, mainly focusing on AFL and cricket while she was also involved in Foxtel's Olympics coverage at the 2010 Vancouver Winter Olympics and 2012 London Olympics. Jones was subsequently a reporter during Fox Sports coverage of the Big Bash.

In 2016, Jones presented AFL Tonight on Fox Sports News and later become a boundary rider in Fox Footy’s AFL coverage. In June of that year, Jones filled in as studio host of Fox Thursday Night coverage after Eddie McGuire stepped down from the after he made sexist comments on radio earlier that week; Jones filled the hosting role on Thursdays for the remainder of the season.

Her roles expanded in 2018, when she hosted On The Mark with fellow female broadcasters Kelli Underwood and Neroli Meadows. Jones subsequently hosted Fox Footy's match-day coverage, mainly on Thursdays and Saturdays, and also during the AFLW while she was host during Fox Footy's Grand Final Day preview. Jones also MC’d awards multiple award ceremonies, including the All-Australian awards, the AFLPA MVP, and the Australian Football Hall of Fame.

In 2018, Jones joined Fox Cricket as a host and boundary reporter during its BBL coverage after the network regained cricket rights in Australia.

References

1982 births
Living people
Fox Sports announcers
Australian television presenters
People from Echuca